Sium bin Diau (13 October 1935) represented North Borneo in the triple jump at the 1956 Summer Olympics, he finished 28th.

References

External links
 

Athletes (track and field) at the 1956 Summer Olympics
1935 births
Olympic athletes of North Borneo
Living people
Malaysian male triple jumpers
People from Sabah